Shibiyeh (also Romanized as Shībīyeh) is a village in Mahur Berenji Rural District, Sardasht District, Dezful County, Khuzestan Province, Iran. At the 2006 census, its population was 85, in 10 families.

References 

Populated places in Dezful County